List of films released in Assamese cinema in the Assamese language.

 List of Assamese films of the 1930s
 List of Assamese films of the 1940s
 List of Assamese films of the 1950s
 List of Assamese films of the 1960s
 List of Assamese films of the 1970s
 List of Assamese films of the 1980s
 List of Assamese films of the 1990s
 List of Assamese films of the 2000s
 List of Assamese films of the 2010s
 List of Assamese films of 2014
 List of Assamese films of 2015
 List of Assamese films of 2016
 List of Assamese films of 2017
 List of Assamese films of 2018
 List of Assamese films of 2019
List of Assamese films of the 2020s
 List of Assamese films of 2020
 List of Assamese films of 2021
 List of Assamese films of 2022
 List of Assamese films of 2023

See also
 National Film Award for Best Feature Film in Assamese

External links
  List of Movies (Passed by the Censor Board) at rupaliparda.com.

Lists of Indian films
Lists of films by language